Ivan Yosifov Buresh (27 December 1885 – 8 August 1980) was a Bulgarian zoologist and entomologist who has been dubbed "the patriarch of Bulgarian biology".

Ivan Buresh was born in Sofia, the capital of the Principality of Bulgaria, to the family of Czech zincographer and photographer Josef Bureš who had settled in Bulgaria after the Liberation in 1878. Buresh finished high school in Sofia and studied natural science at Charles University in Prague and Sofia University. He graduated in 1909 and continued his post-graduate education at the University of Munich under world-famous zoologist Richard Hertwig and Franz Theodor Doflein.

From 1914 on, Buresh was curator of the Royal Museum of Natural History. In 1918, he was promoted to director of the Royal Institutes of Natural Science, which included the Royal Museum of Natural History, the Sofia Zoo and the Botanical Garden, among other institutions. He held that post until 1946. In 1926, he was admitted to the Bulgarian Academy of Sciences as a corresponding member; in 1929, he became a full academic member. From 1947 until his retirement in 1959, Buresh headed the Bulgarian Academy of Sciences' Institute of Zoology. Buresh died in Sofia in 1980, aged 94.

Ivan Buresh took an interest in zoology in his school years. He published his first article on that subject in 1905; his body of work includes over 200 scientific and popular science articles. Although his main area of research was entomology, he also contributed to Bulgarian spelaeology, herpetology and botany. Despite his close ties to both Tsar Ferdinand and Tsar Boris III, Ivan Buresh was never actively engaged in politics.

References

Bulgarian entomologists
Bulgarian biologists
Charles University alumni
Sofia University alumni
Ludwig Maximilian University of Munich alumni
Members of the Bulgarian Academy of Sciences
1885 births
1980 deaths
Scientists from Sofia
Bulgarian people of Czech descent
20th-century Bulgarian zoologists